Larimer County is a county located in the U.S. state of Colorado. As of the 2020 census, the population was 359,066. The county seat and most populous city is Fort Collins. The county was named for William Larimer, Jr., the founder of Denver.

Larimer County comprises the Fort Collins, CO Metropolitan Statistical Area. The county is located at the northern end of the Front Range, at the edge of the Colorado Eastern Plains along the border with Wyoming.

History
Larimer County was created in 1861, and was named after General William Larimer.

Unlike that of much of Colorado, which was founded on the mining of gold and silver, the settlement of Larimer County was based almost entirely on agriculture, an industry that few thought possible in the region during the initial days of the Colorado Gold Rush. The mining boom almost entirely passed the county by. It would take the introduction of irrigation to the region in the 1860s to bring the first widespread settlement to the area.

Early history

At the time of the arrival of Europeans in the early 19th century, the present-day county was occupied by Native Americans, with the Utes occupying the mountainous areas and the Cheyenne and Arapaho living on the piedmont areas along the base of the foothills. French fur trappers infiltrated the area in the early decades of the 19th century, soon after the area became part of the United States with the Louisiana Purchase and was organized as part of the Missouri Territory. In 1828 William H. Ashley ascended the Cache la Poudre River on his way to the Green River in present-day Utah. The river itself received its name in the middle 1830s from an obscure incident in which French-speaking trappers hid gunpowder along its banks, somewhere near present-day Laporte or Bellvue. In 1848 a group of Cherokee crossed through the county following the North Fork of the Poudre to the Laramie Plains on their way to California along a route that became known as the Cherokee Trail.

The area of county was officially opened to white settlement following negotiations with the Cheyenne and Arapaho in the 1858 Treaty of Fort Laramie, by which time the area was part of the Nebraska Territory. The first U.S. settlers arrived that same year in a party led by Antoine Janis from Fort Laramie. Janis, who had visited the area near Bellvue in 1844 and proclaimed it "the most beautiful place on earth", returned to file his official claim and helped found the first U.S. settlement in present-day Colorado, called Colona, just west of Laporte. Nearly simultaneously, Mariano Medina established Fort Namaqua along the Big Thompson River just west of present-day Loveland.  The first irrigation canals were established along the Poudre in the 1860s.

In 1862 the settlement established by Janis became a stagecoach stop along the Overland Stage Route which was established because of threats of attacks from Native Americans on the northern trails in Wyoming. In 1861, Laporte was designated as the first county seat after the organization of the Colorado Territory. In 1862, the United States Army established an outpost near Laporte that was designated as Camp Collins. A devastating flood in June 1864 wiped out the outpost, forcing the Army to seek a better location. At the urging of Joseph Mason, who had settled along the Poudre in 1860, the Army relocated its post downstream adjacent to Mason's land along the Overland stage route. The site of the new post became the nucleus of the town of Fort Collins, incorporated in 1873 after the withdrawal of the Army. By that time, Mason and others had convinced the Colorado Territorial Legislature to designate the new town as the county seat.  In 1870, the legislature designated Fort Collins as the location of the state agricultural college (later Colorado State University), although the institution would exist only on paper for another 9 years while local residents sought money to construct the first campus buildings. In 1873, Robert A. Cameron and other members of the Greeley Colony established the Fort Collins Agricultural Colony, which greatly expanded the grid plan and population of Fort Collins.

Railroads
One of the primary goals of the early citizens of the county was the courting of railroads. County residents were disappointed when the Denver Pacific Railroad bypassed the county in 1870 in favor of Greeley. The first railroad finally arrived in the county in 1877 when the Colorado Central Railroad extended a line north from Golden via Longmont to Cheyenne. The town council of Fort Collins designated right-of-way through the center of town (and through the campus of the unbuilt college) for the line, creating a contentious issue to this day.

Along the new railroad sprung up the new platted towns of Loveland and Berthoud, named respectively after the president and chief surveyor of the Colorado Central. Likewise, Wellington (founded in 1903) was named for a railroad employee. The Greeley, Salt Lake, and Pacific Railroad arrived three years later as a subsidiary of the Union Pacific Railroad, with the intention of creating a transcontinental line over Cameron Pass. Although the line was never extended over the mountains, it opened up the quarrying of stone for the railroad at Stout, furnishing another industry for the region. The brief attempt at the mining of gold in the region centered at the now ghost town of Manhattan in the Poudre Canyon.

Agriculture
The early growth of agriculture, which depended highly on direct river irrigation, experienced a second boom in 1902 with the introduction of the cultivation of sugar beets, accompanied by the construction of the large processing plant of the Great Western Sugar Co. in Loveland. In the following decade, the sugar beet industry brought large numbers of German emigrants from the Russian Empire to the county. The neighborhoods of Fort Collins northeast of the Poudre were constructed largely to house these new families.

A significant increase in the agricultural productivity of the region came in the 1930s with the construction of the Colorado Big Thompson Project following the Great Depression, sort of a third boom for the agricultural industry around Fort Collins.  This project collected and captured Western Slope water, and carried it over to the Front Range Colorado counties of Boulder, Larimer, and Weld, along with extensive water storage and distribution system, which significantly extended the irrigable growing season and brought substantial additional land under irrigation for the first time.

Geography

Adjacent counties
 Laramie County, Wyoming—northeast
 Weld County—east
 Boulder County—south
 Grand County—southwest
 Jackson County—west
 Albany County, Wyoming—northwest

Major highways
  Interstate 25
  U.S. Highway 34
  U.S. Highway 36
  U.S. Highway 87
  U.S. Highway 287
  State Highway 1
  State Highway 7
  State Highway 14
  State Highway 56
  State Highway 60
  State Highway 66
  State Highway 392
  State Highway 402

National protected areas
 Cache La Poudre Wilderness
 Comanche Peak Wilderness
 Neota Wilderness
 Rawah Wilderness
 Rocky Mountain National Park
 Roosevelt National Forest

State protected areas
 Boyd Lake State Park
 Lory State Park

Demographics

As of the census of 2000, there were 251,494 people, 97,164 households, and 63,156 families residing in the county.  The population density was 97 people per square mile (37/km2).  There were 105,392 housing units at an average density of 40 per square mile (16/km2).  The racial makeup of the county was 91.44% White, 0.66% Black or African American, 0.66% Native American, 1.56% Asian, 0.08% Pacific Islander, 3.41% from other races, and 2.19% from two or more races.  8.27% of the population were Hispanic or Latino of any race.

There were 97,164 households, out of which 31.70% had children under the age of 18 living with them, 53.60% were married couples living together, 7.90% had a female householder with no husband present, and 35.00% were non-families. Of all households 23.40% were made up of individuals, and 6.30% had someone living alone who was 65 years of age or older.  The average household size was 2.52 and the average family size was 2.99.

In the county, the population was spread out, with 23.80% under the age of 18, 14.20% from 18 to 24, 30.70% from 25 to 44, 21.80% from 45 to 64, and 9.60% who were 65 years of age or older.  The median age was 33 years. For every 100 females there were 99.90 males.  For every 100 females age 18 and over, there were 98.20 males.

The median income for a household in the county was $48,655, and the median income for a family was $58,866. Males had a median income of $40,829 versus $27,859 for females. The per capita income for the county was $23,689.  About 4.30% of families and 9.20% of the population were below the poverty line, including 6.80% of those under age 18 and 4.40% of those age 65 or over.

Communities

Cities
 Fort Collins
 Loveland

Towns
 Berthoud (partially in Larimer and partially in Weld county)
 Estes Park
 Johnstown (partially in Larimer and partially in Weld county)
 Timnath
 Wellington
 Windsor (partially in Larimer and partially in Weld County)

Census-designated places
 LaPorte
 Red Feather Lakes

Unincorporated communities

 Bellvue
 Buckeye
 Campion
 Cherokee Park
 Drake
 Glendevey
 Glen Haven
 Livermore
 Kinikinik
 Masonville
 Norfolk
 Pinewood Springs
 Pingree Park
 Poudre Park
 Rustic
 Waverly

Ghost towns
 Manhattan
 Old Roach
 Virginia Dale

Politics

Larimer was long a Republican stronghold.  Between 1920 and 2004, the only Democratic presidential candidate to win a majority of votes in the county was Lyndon Johnson in 1964. However, increasing urbanization, as well as the influence of Colorado State University, caused the Republican margins to decline steadily in the 1990s and early 2000s. In 2008, Barack Obama became the first Democrat to carry the county with the majority of the vote since 1964, and in so doing recorded the best performance by a Democrat since the days of Woodrow Wilson and William Jennings Bryan. In 2020, Joe Biden's margin of victory was even greater.

Larimer County is a bellwether county; as of the 2020 election, it has voted for the statewide winner in every election since 1948, when Harry Truman carried Colorado without it.

Education
 Park R3 (Estes Park)
 Poudre R1 (Fort Collins & Surrounding Area)
 Thompson R2-J (Berthoud & Loveland)

Fort Collins is home to Colorado State University.

Recreation

Prehistoric site
Lindenmeier Site

National trails
Continental Divide National Scenic Trail
Greyrock Mountain National Recreation Trail
Mount McConnel National Recreation Trail
Round Mountain National Recreation Trail

Bicycle route
Great Parks Bicycle Route
Poudre River Trail
Spring Creek Trail
Mason Trail
Fossil Creek Trail
Cathy Fromme Prairie Natural Area
Power Trail
Loveland's Recreation Trail

Scenic byways
Cache La Poudre-North Park Scenic and Historic Byway
Peak to Peak Scenic and Historic Byway
Trail Ridge Road/Beaver Meadow National Scenic Byway

Other features and attractions
Poudre Canyon
Horsetooth Mountain
Big Thompson Canyon
Medicine Bow Mountains
Front Range

See also

 Colorado census statistical areas
 Fort Collins-Loveland Metropolitan Statistical Area
 Front Range Urban Corridor
 Heele County, Jefferson Territory
 Index of Colorado-related articles
 National Register of Historic Places listings in Larimer County, Colorado
 Outline of Colorado

Notes

References

External links

 
 Rocky Mountain National Park website
 Colorado County Evolution by Don Stanwyck
 Colorado Historical Society
 Community website for Larimer County specifically Fort Collins and the surrounding areas.

 

 
1861 establishments in Colorado Territory
Colorado counties
Populated places established in 1861